The Paul Selvin Award is a special award presented by the Writers Guild of America. It is given to the script that "best embodies the spirit of the constitutional and civil rights and liberties which are indispensable to the survival of free writers everywhere and to whose defense Paul Selvin committed his professional life." With the exception of 2007 in which no award was given, it has been presented annually since the 42nd Writers Guild of America Awards in 1990. No writer has won more than one award.

Winners

Notes
 The year indicates when the film was released. The awards are presented the following year.

1980s

1990s

2000s

2010s

2020s

Types of winners
The Paul Selvin Award has been awarded to various platforms of film and television. 18 theatrical films have received the award, along with 8 television films, 2 individual episodes of a television series, 1 miniseries, and 1 documentary.

References

Writers Guild of America Awards